Pierre Petitot (11 December 1760, in Langres – 7 November 1840, in Paris) was a French sculptor.

Petitot initially studied under Claude François Devosge at the École des Beaux-Arts in Dijon. In 1788 he won the first major sculpture prize founded by the States of Burgundy, which allowed him to travel and stay in Rome. His award-winning statue was on display in the Musée des Beaux-Arts de Dijon. After he returned to France, he was imprisoned on suspicion of being a counter-revolutionary, and was freed after the fall of Robespierre on 27 July 1794. He regularly exhibited at the Salon (Paris) until 1819. He worked with Pierre Cartellier and Joseph Espercieux. The Museum of Dijon has an oil on canvas portrait of him painted by the artist Pierre-Paul Prud'hon, and The Louvre also contains some of his works.

References

 Hoefer (Jean Chrétien Ferdinand) new general biography (Vol.39), published in 1853

1760 births
1840 deaths
18th-century French sculptors
19th-century French sculptors
French male sculptors
People from Langres
19th-century French male artists
18th-century French male artists